Liberty Grove is a ghost town in Delta County, Texas, United States. The community was settled by 1854, the year its school opened. The farming community included the school and a cemetery as of 1936. In 1966, the community had about 25 residents. The community's cemetery was relocated in 1989, and the community was subsequently abandoned and flooded by Cooper Lake. A campsite in Cooper Lake State Park bears the community's name.

References

Geography of Delta County, Texas
Ghost towns in East Texas